Leqa' Al-Ghareemayn (Arabic: لقاء الغريمين), also known as Al-derbi Al-Kuwaity,  or Clasico Al-Kora Al-Kuwaitia (Arabic language) is the nickname of a football match (derby) between the rivals Al-Arabi and Qadsia. The rivalry comes about as Hawally and Capital are the two cities in Kuwait, and the two clubs are the most successful and influential football clubs in the country.

Statistics

Total Head to Head Results 

The following table lists the history, of meetings between Qadsia SC and Al-Arabi SC, updated to the most recent classico of 10 March 2023 (Qadsia–Al-Arabi 2–1)

All-Time Top Scorers

Records
Record victory – Al Arabi 7–1 Al Qadsia (10 January 1962)
Record goals in match – 8
 Al Arabi 7–1 Al Qadsia (10 January 1962)
 Al Qadsia 5–3 Al Arabi (February 1975)

Personnel at both clubs

Players 
Qadsia then Al Arabi
 1997:  Faisal Bourgba
 2002:  Mishari Jassim
 2016:  Doris Fuakumputu
 2016:  Hamad Al-Enezi
 2017:  Mohammad Rashed
 2017:  Brahima Keita
 2019:  Hamad Aman
 2020:  Mohammad Znefer
 2021:  Oday Dabbagh
 2021:  Sultan Al Enezi
 2021:  Saif Al Hashan

Al Arabi then Qadsia
 1964:  Abdullah Al Asfour
 2010:  Firas Al-Khatib
 2018:  Khaled Al-Rashidi
 2022:  Bernard Doumbia
 2022:  Ali Jarrakh
 2022:  Abdullah Al Shemali

Managers 
  Mohammed Ebrahim
 Qadsia: 1999–2000, 2002–2004, 2005–2007, 2008–2011 and 2012–2014
 Al-Arabi: 2017–2018

See also
 Major football rivalries

References

Al-Arabi SC (Kuwait)
Qadsia SC
Football rivalries in Kuwait
Nicknamed sporting events